Route 529, or Highway 529, may refer to:

Canada
Alberta Highway 529
 Ontario Highway 529
 Ontario Highway 529A

United States